John Chen Shi-zhong (26 December 1917 – 16 December 2012 in Yibin, Sichuan, China) was the Roman Catholic bishop of the Roman Catholic Diocese of Suifu (Yibin), China.

Born in 1917 to a Chinese Catholic family and raised in Yibin, Bishop Chen was ordained to the priesthood in 1947.

Chen was imprisoned twice, first time during the 1950s and again during the Cultural Revolution in the 1960s. He was rehabilitated in 1981 and was named bishop in 1985. He was recognized by the Holy See and the People's Republic of China as bishop. In 1988 to 1989 he was briefly rector of the regional seminary in Szechwan, before returning to his diocese in Yibin, due to ill health. In 2011, Peter Luo Xuegang was consecrated as coadjutor bishop of Yibin (Suifu) to assist Shizhong.

Notes and references

Sichuanese Roman Catholics
1917 births
2012 deaths
People from Yibin
20th-century Roman Catholic bishops in China
21st-century Roman Catholic bishops in China